Matt Duncan (born 29 August 1959)  is a former Scotland international rugby union player.

Rugby Union career

Amateur career

At club level, he played on the wing for West of Scotland.

Provincial career

He played for Glasgow District. He was part of the famous 1989-90 squad that went unbeaten throughout the season; and won the Scottish Inter-District Championship.

International career

He was capped by Scotland 'B' twice in the period 1985-86.

His international debut came during the 1986 Five Nations Championship against France at Murrayfield. He went on to score in the following two games. He scored four tries at the 1987 Rugby World Cup. His final appearance was against Wales at Murrayfield in 1989.

He made 18 appearances for the Scotland.

References

1959 births
Living people
Rugby union players from Glasgow
Scottish rugby union players
Scotland international rugby union players
Rugby union wings
Glasgow District (rugby union) players
West of Scotland FC players
Scotland 'B' international rugby union players